Waking Giants is the third full-length album by the Melodic Hardcore band Life in Your Way. It was released in 2007 on Solid State Records.

Track listing
All songs by Life in Your Way

"Reach the End" - 3:49
"Worthwhile" - 3:36
"We Don't Believe" - 3:17
"Making Waves" - 4:34
"The Shame" - 2:54
"Salty Grave" - 4:20
"Help! The Arm of the Mighty" - 3:35
"Threads of Sincerity" - 5:49
"The Beauty of Grace" - 2:41
"Judas" - 2:46
"Beneath It All" - 4:00

Personnel
Life in Your Way
Jeremy Kellam - bass guitar
Dave Swanson - guitar
John Gaskill - drums
Joshua Kellam - lead vocals
James Allen - guitar

Production and design
Produced by Ben Kaplan and GGGarth
Engineering, programming, and keyboards by Ben Kaplan
Additional engineering: Alex Aligizakus
Assistant engineer: Quentin Gauthier
Mixed by Bill Kennedy
Recorded and mixed at The Farm, Gibsons, British Columbia
Mastered by Troy Glessner at Spectre Studios
Art direction: Life in Your Way & Invisible Creature
Design: Josh Horton for Invisible Creature
Photography: Jerad Knudson

References

External links
 Life in Your Way on Myspace

2007 albums
Life in Your Way albums
Solid State Records albums